Rubia argyi is a species of flowering plant of the family Rubiaceae. Its common names may include "East Asian madder".

References

argyi